The Memory of Eva Ryker is a 1980 American television drama film starring Natalie Wood, Robert Foxworth and Ralph Bellamy. It was produced by Irwin Allen and directed by Walter Grauman.

It was based on a 1978 novel by Donald Stanwood which was originally set on the Titanic.

Filming took place in late 1979.

Plot
A woman has spent her life tormented by the death of her mother, who was on a cruise ship torpedoed during World War II. When her father hires an investigator to look into the circumstances of her mother's death, it triggers a new rash of emotional turmoil for the woman.

Cast
Natalie Wood as Eva Ryker / Claire Ryker  
Robert Foxworth as Norman Hall  
Ralph Bellamy as William E. Ryker  
Roddy McDowall as MacFarland  
Bradford Dillman as Jason Eddington  
Jean-Pierre Aumont as Inspector Laurier  
Mel Ferrer as Dr. Sanford  
Peter Graves as Mike Rogers  
Morgan Fairchild as Lisa Eddington  
Robert Hogan as J.H. Martin
Vince Howard as Albert
Tonya Crowe as Eva as a child

References

External links
Memory of Eva Ryker at IMDb
The Memory of Eva Ryker at BFI
The Memory of Eva Ryker at Irwin Allen
Review of novel at Kirkus
Review of film at Washington Post

1980 films
1980 drama films
1980 television films
1980s English-language films
American drama television films
CBS original programming
Films based on American novels
Films directed by Walter Grauman
Films scored by Richard LaSalle
1980s American films